Mexcala kabondo is a jumping spider species in the genus Mexcala that lives in the Democratic Republic of the Congo, Malawi and Tanzania. It was first described by Wanda Wesołowska in 2009.

References

Salticidae
Arthropods of the Democratic Republic of the Congo
Arthropods of Malawi
Arthropods of Tanzania
Spiders of Africa
Spiders described in 2009
Taxa named by Wanda Wesołowska